FK Bačka may refer to:

 FK Bačka Bačka Palanka, a Serbian football club based in Bačka Palanka
 FK Bačka 1901, a Serbian football club based in Subotica
 FK Bačka Topola, a Serbian football club based in Bačka Topola